Un caso di coscienza is an Italian television series.
This series of legal thriller genres, is composed of 5 seasons, each consisting of 6 episodes from the life of about 95 minutes each. With regard to the first season aired on Rai 2, the  following went on air on Rai 1.

The series is directed by Luigi Perelli, played by Sebastiamo Somma, Loredana Cannata, Stephan Danailov and Barbara Livi, producend by Mario Rossini for Red Film and Rai Fiction in collaboration with the Friuli-Venezia Giulia Film Commission, as it is set and filmed primarily in Trieste.

In May 2012, begin filming the fifth season of the drama. All the cast is confirmed with the new entry of Vittoria Belvedere.

Cast 
 Sebastiano Somma : Avv. Rocco Tasca
 Loredana Cannata : Alice Morandi
 Stephan Danailov : Virgilio
 Barbara Livi : Erica Lacerba
 Karen Ciaurro : Eva Tasca
 Philipe Boa : Louis
 Silvia Gavarotti : Lidia
 David Coco : Stefano Croce

External links
 

Italian television series
Italian legal television series
RAI original programming